Belhar Secondary School (Afrikaans: Belhar Sekondêre Skool)
is an Afrikaans/English mixed medium school in Belhar, Western Cape, South Africa.  As of 2006 it had some 1,274 students  and was staffed by 35 educators. . In 2006 the Western Cape Education Department designated it one of 10 "Arts and Culture focus schools" to be set up over the following three years.

External links
 Western Cape Education Department profile

Schools in Cape Town
High schools in South Africa